Talk Show is the third studio album by the American rock band the Go-Go's, released on the I.R.S. label in 1984. Although some critics considered it an inspired return to form after their second album Vacation, other than the No. 11 hit single "Head over Heels", the album was a relative commercial disappointment, peaking at No. 18 and selling fewer than 500,000 copies. This would be the last all-original album by the group until 2001's God Bless The Go-Go's.

Many of the songs on the album have not been performed regularly by the Go-Go's in concert since the band regrouped in the early 1990s. The group's original breakup occurred shortly after the album and tour were completed. Only "Head over Heels" has been played live on a regular basis - by the band and in Belinda Carlisle's solo show. Some songs haven't been played since the 1984 Prime Time tour.

The music video for the first single "Head over Heels" was directed by Douglas Brian Martin. The music video for the second single "Turn to You", which peaked at No. 32 in the US Billboard Hot 100, featured a starring role for rising-star actor Rob Lowe; the song was written about baseball pitcher Bob Welch, a one-time boyfriend of Charlotte Caffey. The video director, Mary Lambert, went on to work on several other videos, including hits by Madonna, and on films, such as Pet Sematary. The music video for the album's third single, "Yes or No", was released shortly before the group's breakup was announced, possibly hurting the song's sales and chart performance (peaked at No. 84).

The flip side of "Head over Heels", "Good for Gone", did not appear on the initial album release, but was included in some CD releases of Talk Show, and also appeared on The Go-Go's 1994 boxed set of rarities, singles, deep cuts and new songs, "Return to the Valley of the Go-Go's".

Jane Wiedlin confirmed in Alison Ellwood's 2020 documentary of the band that the recording of her song "Forget That Day" contributed to her leaving the band. Wiedlin had wanted to be the main vocalist on the track, which was very personal to her. The rest of the band refused. "One of them said, 'What makes you think you're good enough to sing the song?,'" Wiedlin said. 

An argument of the share of royalties is what ultimately caused Wiedlin to leave the band, as despite writing most of the songs, Wiedlin was told she would share her royalties. "And then I said, 'F–k you, I quit,'" she stated in the documentary.

In 2016, Edsel Records reissued remastered deluxe editions, all with bonus tracks, of the Go-Go's original three releases.

Track listing

Personnel
Band members
Charlotte Caffey – lead guitar, keyboards, backing vocals
Belinda Carlisle – lead vocals
Gina Schock – drums, percussion, backing vocals
Kathy Valentine – bass, lead guitar, backing vocals
Jane Wiedlin – rhythm guitar, backing vocals

Production
Martin Rushent – producer, engineer
Dave Allen, Philip Tennant, Jim Russell – assistant engineers
Nathan Lam – vocal direction
Douglas Brian Martin – art direction
Chris Craymer – photography
Frontline – management

Charts 
 

Album

Singles

References

1984 albums
The Go-Go's albums
Albums produced by Martin Rushent
I.R.S. Records albums